New Addington South is a ward covering the older part of the New Addington Estate in the London Borough of Croydon. It largely replaced the former New Addington Ward, and entered into force on 3 May 2018.

List of Councillors

Mayoral election results 
Below are the results for the candidate which received the highest share of the popular vote in the ward at each mayoral election.

Ward Results

References 

Wards of the London Borough of Croydon